Thomas Hyatt may refer to:

Thomas Hyatt (New York City), member of the 46th and 47th New York State Legislatures
Tommy Hyatt, fictional character

See also
Thomas Hyatt House